Humphrey Eakins Ellison was Dean of Ferns from 1896 until 1897: His son and grandson son were both eminent scholars.

Notes

Alumni of Trinity College Dublin
Deans of Ferns